The 2022–23 Atlantic Coast Conference men's basketball season began with practices in October 2022, followed by the start of the 2022–23 NCAA Division I men's basketball season in November. Conference play began in December 2022 and concluded March 7–11, 2023, with the 2023 ACC men's basketball tournament at the Greensboro Coliseum in Greensboro, North Carolina. This was the 69th season of Atlantic Coast Conference basketball.

Head coaches

Coaching changes 
 Mike Krzyzewski announced his retirement prior to the 2021–22 season, which he stated would be his final season. Kryzewski was head coach of Duke for forty-two years. After the season concluded, Jon Scheyer became the new head coach at Duke.

 Chris Mack was fired as head coach of Louisville on January 26, 2022. In March of 2022 it was announced that Kenny Payne had been hired as the new head coach.

Coaches 

Notes:
 Year at school includes 2022–23 season.
 Overall and ACC records are from the time at current school and are through the end of the 2021–22 season.
 NCAA tournament appearances are from the time at current school only.
 NCAA Final Fours and championship include time at other schools

Preseason

Recruiting classes

Notes:
 Rankings are up to date as of October 18, 2022.
 NR stands for not ranked.

Preseason watchlists

Preseason polls

ACC Preseason Media poll

The preseason poll and Preseason All-ACC Teams were released on October 18, 2022.

Preseason poll

 North Carolina – 1,504 (90)
 Duke – 1,339 (2)
 Virginia – 1,310 (6)
 Miami – 1,138 (2)
 Florida State – 1,064
 Notre Dame – 971
 Virginia Tech – 921 (1)
 Syracuse – 800
 Wake Forest – 672
 NC State – 548
 Clemson – 528
 Louisville – 477
 Boston College – 368
 Pittsburgh – 320
 Georgia Tech – 260

First-place votes shown in parenthesis.

Preseason All-ACC teams

ACC preseason player of the year 

 Armando Bacot – North Carolina (82)
 Isaiah Wong – Miami (5)
 Caleb Love – North Carolina (4)
 Jeremy Roach – Duke (3)
 PJ Hall – Clemson (2)
 R. J. Davis – North Carolina  (2)
 Terquavion Smith – NC State (1)
 Hunter Cattoor – Virginia Tech (1)
 Dariq Whitehead – Duke (1)

ACC Preseason Freshman of the year

 Dereck Lively II – Duke (57)
 Dariq Whitehead – Duke (25)
 Tyrese Proctor – Duke (5)
 Mark Mitchell – Duke (3)
 Tyler Nickel – North Carolina (2)
 Jalen Washington – North Carolina (2)
 JJ Starling – Notre Dame (2)
 Kyle Filipowski – Duke (2)
 Prince Aligbe – Boston College (1)
 Isaac McKneely – Virginia (1)
 Seth Trimble – North Carolina (1)

Early season tournaments

Source:

Regular season

Rankings

Conference matrix
This table summarizes the head-to-head results between teams in conference play. Each team played 20 conference games, including at least 1 against each opponent.

Player of the week
Throughout the conference regular season, the Atlantic Coast Conference offices named one or two Players of the week and one or two Rookies of the week.

Records against other conferences
2022–23 records against non-conference foes. Records shown for regular season only.  Statistics through games played on February 17, 2023.

Postseason

ACC tournament

The 2023 Atlantic Coast Conference Basketball Tournament was held at the Greensboro Coliseum in Greensboro, North Carolina, from March 7 to 11, 2023.

* – Denotes overtime period

NCAA tournament

National Invitation tournament

Honors and awards

All-Americans

To earn "consensus" status, a player must win honors based on a point system computed from the four different all-America teams. The point system consists of three points for first team, two points for second team and one point for third team. No honorable mention or fourth team or lower are used in the computation. The top five totals plus ties are first team and the next five plus ties are second team.

ACC Awards

Source:

NBA draft

Attendance

References